Mediterranean Editors and Translators (MET) is a non-profit, interdisciplinary association for language professionals who work mainly with or into English within the Mediterranean area. The association's members include translators, authors' editors, copy editors, writing and presentation coaches, teachers of academic writing, applied linguists, interpreters, professional writers and more. MET offers training workshops, an annual conference, networking and other opportunities of continuing professional development for its members. The activities of the association are guided by six objectives, summarized as follows:

 Maintain a stable network and means to hold events for English language consultants 
 Communicate knowledge that can contribute to improving the quality of language support services available in the Mediterranean 
 Be a conduit for exchanging information between language consultants in our geographic area and those in other parts of Europe and the world 
 Stimulate research in Mediterranean communities on the needs of academics, scientists and others and on promising practices that meet their needs well 
 Identify local expertise in language support and help our experts share their knowledge with a wider audience 
 Help users of language support services locate appropriate solutions to their needs and promote mutual understanding between suppliers and users of these services

History and organization 
MET was founded in Barcelona, Spain, in the spring of 2006 after an initial, exploratory meeting the preceding autumn. It is registered in the Generalitat de Catalunya and has a legally binding charter (written in Catalan but translated into English). Its activities are directed by a Governing Council. The council, elected every two years, is composed of council chair and vice-chair, secretary, treasurer, officers for membership, continuing professional development and promotion, and a webmaster.

MET is a member of the Spanish Network of the Anna Lindh Euro-Mediterranean Foundation for the Dialog Between Cultures. It also maintains relationships with:
Associazione Italiana Traduttori e Interpreti (AITI), 
Associació Professional de Traductors i Intèrprets de Catalunya (APTIC), 
Associação Portuguesa de Tradutores e Intérpretes (APTRAD),
Asociación Española de Traductores, Correctores e Intérpretes (ASETRAD),
European Association of Science Editors (EASE), 
Eastern Mediterranean Association of Medical Editors (EMAME), 
Nordic Editors and Translators (NEaT), 
SENSE (based in the Netherlands), and
Chartered Institute of Editing and Proofreading (CIEP). 
The founding of NEaT was inspired by, and based on information from, MET. MET and all these "sister associations" support each other to further the development of the language profession.

Members and membership 

MET's members are mostly based in the Mediterranean region and elsewhere in Europe, but some members from further away join because of their shared interests. MET has both individual and institutional members.

MET's approximately 400 individual members hail from over 30 countries, mostly in Europe but also in North America, South America, Asia and Africa (data of April 2019). They are employed in freelance, entrepreneurial and institutional settings and work in a wide range of subject areas including science, technology, engineering, medicine, business, commerce, finance, law, politics, art and other cultural areas. Because of the association's focus on communication in the English language, many members originate from countries where English is the vernacular.

MET’s institutional membership is a way for institutions and companies to access continuing professional development activities for their staff and to support the association’s mission. Currently there are about 10 institutional members.

Conferences 
MET holds a conference every year, usually in early autumn. This is also the occasion for the general assembly of the members. Conferences tend to last 1.5 days and are preceded by two half-days of training workshops. Each “MET meeting” is named with the acronym of METM followed by the last two digits of the year. For example, METM20 was the name given to the 2020 meeting, which was scheduled for October 2020 but cancelled due to the COVID-19 pandemic.

Previous METMs and their themes are:
 METM22, Donostia/San Sebastián: The personal touch
 METM19, Split: Make it count: communicating with clarity and concision
 METM18, Girona: Giving credit where credit's due: recognition for authors, translators and editors
 METM17, Brescia: Understanding our clients: the writing process from concept to completion
 METM16, Tarragona: Raising standards through knowledge sharing and peer training
 METM15, Coimbra: Versatility and readiness for new challenges (held in conjunction with PRISEAL 3: Publishing and Presenting Research Internationally)
 METM14, San Lorenzo de El Escorial: Innovation and tradition: mining the human resource 
 METM13, Poblet Monastery (Vimbodí i Poblet, Spain): Language, culture and identity
 METM12, Venice: Craft and critical vision—diving beneath the surface of discourse 
 METM11, Barcelona: Quality in English translation and editing—from research to practice and back 
 METM10, Tarragona: Facilitating knowledge transfer—editing, translating, coaching 
 METM09, Barcelona: Translation, editing, writing—broadening the scope and setting limits 
 METM08, Split: Communication support across the disciplines 
 METM07, Madrid: Building bridges, constructing networks 
 METM06, Barcelona: International communication—promising practices 
 METM05, Barcelona: Interdisciplinary collaboration—international communication

Workshop program 
MET organizes one or more workshop days during the spring and summer. A full day of workshops is also offered prior to the annual conference. The workshops are usually developed and delivered by MET members and offer continuing professional development for editors and translators. The topics dealt with include knowledge updates in specialized fields, language issues, tools for language professionals, and business development.

Publications 
MET members have written a guide entitled "The English-Language Consultant: MET’s guidelines for choosing an editor, translator, interpreter or other language service provider"; the second, revised edition is available on the association's website. 

Discussions at two MET conferences have led to the publication of multiauthor, edited volumes about academic writing. In 2013, a limited group of MET members and their colleagues published the edited volume Supporting Research Writing: Roles and challenges in multilingual settings (based on a panel discussion at METM09). In 2017, another group of members, invited speakers and colleagues published the edited volume Publishing Research in English as an Additional Language: Practices, pathways and potentials (based on talks presented at METM15; free e-book).

Additional publications by MET members related to the annual conferences, including reviews of the meetings and papers based on the presentations, are listed on the association's website.

References

External links 
MET website

Communications and media organizations
Professional associations based in Spain
Applied linguistics
International professional associations
Translation associations